Heterogeneous nuclear ribonucleoproteins A2/B1 is a protein that in humans is encoded by the HNRNPA2B1 gene.

Structure
HNRNPA2B1 gene contains 12 exons, including a B1 protein specific 36-nucleotide mini-exon. The entire length of intron/exon organization of HNRNPA2B1 is identical to that of the HNRNPA1 gene which indicates a common origin by gene duplication.

Function 

This gene belongs to the A/B subfamily of ubiquitously expressed heterogeneous nuclear ribonucleoproteins (hnRNPs). The hnRNPs are RNA binding proteins and they complex with heterogeneous nuclear RNA (hnRNA). These proteins are associated with pre-mRNAs in the nucleus and appear to influence pre-mRNA processing and other aspects of mRNA metabolism and transport. While all of the hnRNPs are present in the nucleus, some seem to shuttle between the nucleus and the cytoplasm. The hnRNP proteins have distinct nucleic acid binding properties. The protein encoded by this gene has two repeats of quasi-RRM domains that bind to RNAs. This gene has been described to generate two alternatively spliced transcript variants which encode different isoforms.
HnRNPA2B1 is an autoantigen in autoimmune diseases such as rheumatoid arthritis, systemic lupus erythematosus and mixed connective tissue disease. When referred to as an autoantigen, hnRNPA2B1 is also known as RA33.

The HNRNPA2 and HNRNPB1 proteins are involved in packaging nascent mRNA, in alternative splicing, and in cytoplasmic RNA trafficking, translation, and stabilization. HNRNPA2 and HNRNPB1 also appear to function in telomere maintenance, cell proliferation and differentiation, and glucose transport.

Function of HNRNPA2B1 gene can be effectively examined by siRNA knockdown based on an independent validation.

Interactions 

HNRPA2B1 has been shown to interact with casein kinase 2, alpha 1.

Role in diseases

The mutation p.D290V/302V in hnRNPA2B1 is implicated in dementia, myopathy, PDB, and ALS. Mutations in hnRNPA2B1 and hnRNPA1 cause of amyotrophic lateral sclerosis and multisystem proteinopathy. hnRNPA2/B1 is found to activate cyclooxygenase-2 and promote tumor growth in human lung cancers.

References

Further reading